The  high-spired elimia (Elimia hartmaniana) was a species of freshwater snail with an operculum, aquatic gastropod mollusks in the family Pleuroceridae. This species was endemic to the United States. It is now extinct.

References 

Elimia
Extinct gastropods
Gastropods described in 1861
Taxa named by Isaac Lea
Taxonomy articles created by Polbot